The Mausoleum of Seven Martyrs or Saptashikha is located at Phulbari in Lengura Union at the foot of a hill in Kalmakanda Upazila bordering Netrakona district.

History
On 26 July 1971, during the Bangladesh Liberation War, seven fighters were killed in a gun battle with the Pakistan army at the junction of three roads adjacent to the Nazirpur Union Land Office in Kalmakanda Upazila. Their bodies were later buried at Phulbari in Lengura Union, known as the Mausoleum of Seven Martyrs.

Name of the martyrs 
 Dr. Abdul Aziz
 Md. Fazlul Haque
 Md. Yar Mahmud
 Bhabatosh Chandra Das
 Md. Nuruzzaman
 Dwijendra Chandra Biswas
 Md. Jamal Uddin

References

Netrokona District
Historic sites in Bangladesh